Vento is a surname of Italian and Finnish origin.

Vento is surname for 803 Finns (2017). It can also refer to a character in old Finnish poetry. As a surname it can refer to:
 Jouni Vento (born 1966, artist name Martti Waris), Finnish musician in Eläkeläiset
 Jouni Vento (born 1966), Finnish ice hockey player
 Urpo Vento (born 1935), former Secretary General of the Finnish Literature Society 
Vento as a surname of Italian origin that may refer to:

Bruce Vento (1940–2000), American politician
Flavia Vento (born 1977), Italian model and actress
Guillermo Vento (born 1921), Venezuelan baseball player
Joey Anthony Vento (1939–2011), American cook and restaurateur
Jorge Pérez Vento (born  1947), Cuban former volleyball player 
María Vento-Kabchi (born 1974), Venezuelan tennis player
Mike Vento (born 1978), American baseball player
Sergio Vento (born 1938), Italian diplomat
Marcus Perperna Vento (Perperna also spelled Perpenna and Vento also spelled Veiento, died 72 BC), a Roman aristocrat, statesman and general

See also
Vento (motorcycle manufacturer)
Volkswagen Vento

References

Italian-language surnames
Finnish-language surnames